Ainger may refer to:

 Ainger, Michigan, a settlement in Walton Township, Michigan, USA
 Alfred Ainger (1837–1904), English biographer and critic
 Arthur Campbell Ainger (1841–1919), English Christian hymn writer
 Nick Ainger (born 1949), British Labour Member of Parliament
 Thomas Ainger (1799–1863), English clergyman

English-language surnames